1-acyl-sn-glycerol-3-phosphate acyltransferase beta is an enzyme that in humans is encoded by the AGPAT2 gene.

Function 

This gene encodes a member of the 1-acylglycerol-3-phosphate O-acyltransferase family. The protein is located within the endoplasmic reticulum membrane and converts lysophosphatidic acid to phosphatidic acid, the second step in de novo phospholipid biosynthesis. Mutations in this gene have been associated with congenital generalized lipodystrophy, a disease characterized by a near absence of adipose tissue and severe insulin resistance. Alternate transcriptional splice variants, encoding different isoforms, have been characterized.

References

External links

Further reading